Alessandro Maserati (born 8 September 1979) is an Italian former professional road cyclist.

Major results
2006
 10th Châteauroux Classic
2007
 10th Giro del Mendrisiotto
2008
 4th Overall Giro della Provincia di Grosseto
2009
 10th Ronde van Drenthe
2010
 10th GP Costa Degli Etruschi

References

External links

1979 births
Living people
Italian male cyclists
Sportspeople from the Province of Piacenza
Cyclists from Emilia-Romagna